VNG Corporation (VNG) is a technology company that was founded in 2004. It specialises in digital content, online entertainment, social networking, and e-commerce. It focuses on four main businesses, including online games, platforms, digital payments, and cloud services. Many products developed by VNG have attracted hundreds of millions of users, such as Zalo, ZaloPay, Zing MP3, and 123phim.

According to The ASEAN Post, the company is “Vietnam’s first ever unicorn start-up.”

History

VNG was founded on 9 September 2004 under the name of VinaGame.

 2006-2007: The company focused on developing software products for internet users like "Internet Cyber Station Manager” (CSM), 123mua.com.vn (e-commerce). The company also develop web products under Zing Brand – a comprehensive platform covering information, connection and entertainment for users and ranked by Alexa in August 2008 as ZingMP3 the most popular listening and searching tool for online music in Vietnam.
 2008-2009: Under the name of VNG Corporation.
 2010-2011: Developed an online game called Thuận , which won the “Sao Khue” award in 2010 in the category of Products/Gaming Solutions and Electronic Entertainment. Not only that, but the company also exported the “Un In” online game to Japan.
 2012-2013: VNG caught the mobile trend by focusing on developing products on this platform. The most outstanding one was Zalo which is a mobile application for instant messaging and calls. It reached 10 million users in only 1.5 years.
 2014: VNG was evaluated 1 billion US dollar by World Startup Report and become the first and only unicorn startup of Vietnam 
 2015: VNG was honored "Global Fast-Growing Enterprise in East Asia " by the World Economic Forum (Manila, Philippines) 
 2016: VNG launched Zalopay – a mobile payment application 
 2017: VNG was the first Vietnamese tech company to sign a MOU with the world's second-largest stock exchange Nasdaq to explore a US listing 
 2018: VNG announced new strategic businesses such as finance and payment and cloud services

Data center
VNG has two Tier-3 standard data centers, located in Ho Chi Minh City, and Hanoi.

Products and services

Digital content and online entertainment

Zuni Online Learning

Zuni is an online non-profit education project operated and invested by VNG and VNIF, which was officially published in March 2014. In June 2014, Zuni has nearly 124,000 members with more than 4,000 members active every day. Zuni was evaluated as one of the competent education projects right after its publishing, with 1466 exam samples, 618 video lectures and 124 major topics available currently.

Zing MP3
Zing MP3, a music streaming service, was launched in August 2007, currently consisting of 2 versions: website and app on the iOS, Android and Windows Phone platforms. Zing MP3 application on smartphones has been one of the few most frequently downloaded ones in Vietnam in the past few years. When it was brought onto the mobile platform, Zing MP3 was an outstanding app of Vietnam with over 5 million downloads on Android

Games
 VNG is one of the four main game publishers in the Vietnamese market.
 Produce, develop and globally publish online games as well as import and publish well-known games in the local market.
 Highlighted products: Sky Garden, Võ Lâm Truyền Kỳ (link), Crossfire Legend (link), 360 Games, ...

Community connections

Zing Me social network
Zing Me is a social network operated by VNG, which was introduced in August 2009. It is integrated directly via the Zing system with a variety of special applications like blogging, photo and music sharing, gaming, video clips, email. In addition, Zing Me was the first social network in Vietnam that had the properties of a platform. It allows the third-party developing apps which use common infrastructure and sharing users via opening API (Application Programing Interface) in order to diversify the system contents. In March 2010, Zing Me launched its first version for mobile phones. 
After two year of releasing, Zing Me reached its 8.2 million-user milestone in October 2011. Not only does Zing Me allow users to share their status updates and blog, it also allows them to communicate via photos, voices and emoticons. Zing Me is getting popular with more than one million photos shared by users everyday since June 2013.

Zalo
Zalo is a free message and call application on mobile and desktop released on 8 August 2012 for iOS, Android, Windows Phone.

At the end of May, VTV used Zalo as a bridge for the community to share their feelings and thoughts and send messages of encouragement to the people and soldiers on duty in Spratly Islands.

Finance and payments

123Pay

In order to meet the needs of using internally as well as developing the external market, in 2010, VNG invested in R&D for an Online Payment Platform called 123Pay. This product is inherited and developed on the payment platform of ZingPay (a payment platform used for online games of VNG since 2005).

Zalopay

Up-to-date digital payment and personal payment platforms: mobile wallet Zalopay.

Applications

Laban Key
Laban Key is a Vietnamese keyboard for mobile devices developed by VNG. It was introduced in September 2013 by the Project Manager Pham Kim Long, who is also the developer of the Windows input method editor UniKey.

Software

CSM
Cyber Station Manager (CSM) is a free software from VNG for managing Internet agencies. The first version of CSM was published by VNG on 2 February 2006. CSM is the most popular managing internet shops in Vietnam with over 60% of market share and over 2 million downloads every day. There are 25,000 Internet shops nationwide using CSM to manage play time, extra services, game updates, and automatic applications.

CSM is also got certified for offering national standards TCVN 8702:2011 as in Certificate of Conformance no. B0001310314CS01A3 on 31 March 2014. This Certificate of Conformance is awarded based on the most updated procedures issued in Decision no. 350/QĐ-CVT (new) on September 12, 2013, by Vietnam Telecommunications Authority – Vietnam Ministry of Information and Communications, a substitute for Decision no 75/QĐ-QLCL. In addition, CSM won the Sao Khue Award in the years of 2009, 2012 and 2014.

Cloud services

 Provide full-stack cloud services for organizations and businesses with smart tech solutions linked through Internet connection and cloud technology.
 Highlighted products: 123CS, Cloud server, IoT HUB, vCloudStack

VNG culture 
VNG's headquarter is located in Ho Chi Minh City. People and Corporate Culture are two key elements of VNG. Understanding 3 core values (Embracing Challenges, Advancing Partnership and Upholding Integrity), VNG Starters always keep growing dedicated spirit for the development of VNG and the community.

Scandal 
VNG in particular and the game online industry, in general, are always closely observed by authorities for the risks of social problems related to playing games too much.

Violence 
In December 2010, the inspectors of HCMC Department of Information and Communications required VinaGame that they must eliminate violence in online games. The game "Sudden Attack" was closed in HCMC on 17 October 2011.

Privacy 
The Inspectors examined VNG's conformity to computer software copyright laws leading to an official announcement to charge VinaGame 10 million dong as a fine for copyright infringement.

In addition, the inspectors ordered VinaGame to take down the infringed software and to commit to contacting the authors to discuss the legitimacy. After receiving the decision from the Ministry of Culture - Sports and Tourism, VinaGame had to examine every single computer currently in use, prepare a list, and pay copyright fees for the software that was work-related.

Copyright infringement 
In August 2007, when accessing Zing MP3, which is a musical entertainment tool, you can find such popular names such as Bao Thy, Dan Truong, Duy Manh, Cam Ly, and even Thu Phuong and Bang Kieu – neither of them was allowed to publish songs in Vietnam. According to some lawyers, the websites, which enable searching, collecting and displaying songs, and allow online listening, infringe copyrights.

On 23 and 24 February, 2009 inspectors discovered a software copyright infringement worth VND 5 billion (around US$295,000) during a sudden raid on Vinagame headquarters in Ho Chi Minh City.

In August 2020, VNG sued TikTok for $9.5 million on allegations of copyright infringement.

Awards
September 2013: Chairman of HCMC People's Committee Le Hoang Quan awarded merits to VNG in the recognition of many achievements in the service business and participation in charities and social activities continuously from 2008 to 2012.

October 2013: In the “Awarding Ceremony of HCMC Entrepreneurs 2013”, VNG stood among 105 entrepreneurs to get the award for  “Outstanding HCMC Entrepreneurs 2013”.

April 2014: VNG received the "Third-class Labor Medal " signed by the President of the Socialist Republic of Vietnam and Merits awarded by the Prime Minister to Lê Hồng Minh, chairman and CEO of VNG.

References

External links
 

Companies established in 2004
Online companies of Vietnam
Vietnamese brands
Companies based in Ho Chi Minh City
Vietnamese companies established in 2004
Software companies established in 1996
Video game companies of Vietnam